Mandjoura is a sub-prefecture of Bahr el Gazel in Chad.

References 

Populated places in Chad